Luke Perry (born 1983) is an English artist known for his monumental sculptures most especially those celebrating under-represented peoples and the heritage of the Industrial Revolution, particularly in the Black Country. He is the director and chief artist of his non-profit company Industrial Heritage Stronghold.

Trained at Margaret Street, Perry gained a first class honours with his degree piece (untitled steel manifesto) winning recognition as the only public artwork ever to be featured in the New Generation Arts Festival whilst the accompanying short film 'Poveri Fiori' went on to win awards for film in London.

After an early career in documentary film, winning a bronze medal for short film at the London International Short Film Festival, he returned to the Black Country to establish Industrial Heritage Stronghold (IHS), a not for profit organisation which was to be a vehicle for the production of large-scale public artworks. He has won numerous awards to date including the Cultural Champions Award (Presented by the Minister for Culture Ed Vaisey MP) and Birmingham City University Alumni of the year and a Black Country Masters.

He began to receive national recognition in 2010 when he was a co-presenter of the Channel 4 television series Titanic:The Mission.
In recent years Luke has dedicated his practice towards creating sculptures that level the playing field regarding equal representation of diverse groups in the UK and continues to work on and develop sculptures to this end such as the Lions of the Great War Monument in Smethwick, SS Journey - A Monument to Immigrants and Aethelflaed Queen of Mercia.

For Aethelflaed Queen of Mercia Luke gave a video interview on the making of Aethelflaed. There is a further video of the installation.

Works

 Lions of the Great War - Monument to Soldiers of Undivided India in the First World War
 Aethelflaed - Heroine Queen of Mercia
 SS Journey - A Monument to Immigrants
 James Conway - Stockport's Cockleshell Hero
 Zoroastrian Faroahar
 Lady Chainmakers Monument
 The People of Walsall Wood
 Fisherman, Diver and Land Girl; Colne River Sculpture Park, Watford (2014).
 Pit Head Monument - Walsall Wood
 Titanic Anchor - Netherton
 Titanic Bow - Belfast
 Cradley Column "industrialheritagestronghold.com" - Cradley Heath
 Steel Manifesto
 Wings and Scrubs (2020)
 Bust of Phil Lynott
 Sikh Regiment Memorial
 Adrian Shooter, engineer and railwayman (2022)

References

1983 births
Living people
Alumni of Birmingham City University
English sculptors
English male sculptors
Modern sculptors
People from Cradley Heath
People from the Black Country